Teta, Alf Marra (Arabic for: Grandma, A Thousand Times) is a documentary film about a feisty Beiruti grandmother.

The 50-minute film was produced in 2010 as a UAE/Qatar/Lebanon co-production with the financial support of the Doha Film Institute and Screen Institute Beirut.  The film was produced by Veritas Films. It was the first film to be released by a company based in Twofour54, Abu Dhabi’s media content creation freezone.

“Teta, Alf Marra” achieved several ‘firsts’ for the regional filmmaking industry. It was the first locally produced documentary to show in cinemas in the UAE and secure regional distribution. It was also the first documentary produced in the GCC to qualify for Academy Awards qualification, with theatrical runs in Los Angeles and New York City.

Synopsis
The film is a poetic documentary that puts a feisty Beiruti grandmother at the center of brave film exercises designed to commemorate her many worlds before they are erased by the passage of time and her eventual death.

Teta Fatima is the 83-year-old matriarch of the Kaabour family and the sharp-witted queen bee of an old Beiruti quarter. With great intimacy, the film documents her larger-than-life character as she struggles to cope with the silence of her once-buzzing house and imagines what awaits her beyond death. Meanwhile, her beloved violinist husband (deceased 20 years) is both an essential absence and presence. His features manifest through the face of their filmmaker grandson while his previously unpublished violin improvisations weave through her world and that of the film. Teta, Alf Marra brings together grandfather, grandmother and grandson in a playful documentary that aims to defy a past death and a future one.

Director
Teta, Alf Marra was directed by award-winning filmmaker Mahmoud Kaabour.

Awards
Teta, Alf Marra has won a number of international awards, including:
October 2010: Audience Award for Best Documentary at the Doha Tribeca Film Festival, Qatar
October 2010: Special Jury Mention for filmmaker Mahmoud Kaabour at the Doha Tribeca Film Festival, Qatar
March 2011: Audience Award for Best International Documentary at DOX BOX, Syria
May 2011: Best Film Award at the London International Documentary Festival, UK
September 2011: Trophy in recognition of its contribution to Lebanese Cinema from Fondation Liban Cinema, Lebanon
October 2011: Special Jury Mention for filmmaker Mahmoud Kaabour for "an outstanding way of telling a story" at DocsDF Festival, Mexico
October 2011: Best Film Award in the "Celebrate Age" category at the Mumbai International Film Festival, India
October 2012: Merit Prize at the Taiwan International Film Festival

Festival attendances
October 2010: World Premiere at the Doha Tribeca Film Festival, Qatar
October 2010: African Premiere at Carthage Film Festival, Tunisia
 December 2010: Teta, Alf Marra screened at the grand opening of Mathaf: Arab Museum of Modern Arts, Qatar
 January 2011: UAE Premiere in Abu Dhabi at the National Theatre
January 2011: European Premiere at International Film Festival Rotterdam, The Netherlands
March 2011: Dox Box International Documentary Film Festival Damascus, Syria
April 2011: American Premiere at Tribeca Film Festival New York, USA with a special screening and panel in the “TriBeCa Talks: After the Movie” series
May 2011: UK Premiere at London International Documentary Film Fest, UK
May 2011: Polish Premiere at Krakow Film Festival
May 2011: Festival Cinéma Arabe Amsterdam, The Netherlands
June 2011: Seattle International Film Festival, USA
June 2011: Screening at Royal Film Commission, Amman, Jordan
June 2011: Arab Film Week at INCAA, Buenos Aires, Argentina
July 2011: Arab Film Festival, Sydney, Australia
July 2011: Indianapolis International Film Festival, USA
August 2011: Santiago International Film Festival, Chile
August 2011: Montreal World Film Festival, Montreal, Canada
September 2011: Screening at Fondation Liban Cinema, Lebanon
October 2011: Vancouver International Film Festival, Canada
October 2011: DocsDF Festival, Mexico City, Mexico
October 2011: Arab Film Festival, San Francisco, Berkeley, San Jose, Los Angeles, USA
October 2011: St. John's International Women's Film Festival, Canada
October 2011: Calgary Arab Film Festival, Canada
October 2011: Iihlava International Documentary Film Festival, Czech Republic
October 2011: Thessaloniki Biennale of Contemporary Art, Greece
November 2011: Special Screening Tribeca Cinemas NYC, USA
January 2012: Tromsø International Film Festival, Norway
January 2012: Helsinki Documentary Film Festival, Finland
February 2012: Middle Eastern Film Festival Edinburgh, UK
February 2012: International Film Festival Port- land Oregon, USA
March 2012: Special Screening LAU Alumni Film Festival Beirut, Lebanon 
April and May 2012: Documentary Edge Festival, New Zealand
May 2012: Jacob Burns Film Center New York, USA
June 2012: Shorts Shorts Film Festival & Asia in Japan Tokyo, Japan
Septembre 2012: Special Screening, Semaine du Liban in Paris, Embassy of Lebanon. France 
October 2012: Taiwan International Documentary Festival, Taiwan
October 2012: London MINA Film Festival, UK
October 2012: Bjelovar Film Festival, Croatia

References

External links 
 
 Veritas Films

2010 films
2010 documentary films
Emirati documentary films
Documentary films about women
Documentary films about old age
Documentary films about death
Lebanese documentary films